Trapped in the Sky (aka Army Spy and Sabotage) is a 1939 American thriller film directed by Lewis D. Collins and produced by Larry Darmour for Columbia Pictures. The film stars Jack Holt, Ralph Morgan and Katherine DeMille. Holt is the "flyboy" who is trying to find the saboteurs of a "silent" aircraft. The plot device of a "noiseless" or stealthy aircraft is a familiar theme in aviation films of the period, including The Sky Ranger (1921), The Silent Flier (1926) and Eagle of the Night (1928).

Plot
Inventor Walter Fielding (Holmes Herbert) has been developing a new type of aircraft that is "noiseless". He offers the United States government first option on his invention. When William Fornay (C. Henry Gordon), a foreign agent, offers him three times the army's price, Fielding decides to sabotage the government tests, thus enabling him to sell his patent to the highest bidder.

After the initial test flight ends in a crash and the death of its pilot, Lieutenant Gray (Regis Toomey), United States Army Air Corps flyer Major Roston (Jack Holt) begins to suspect sabotage. Roston decides to go under cover to catch the culprits. He first stages a court martial and fakes his resentment of the army and soon Roston is contacted by enemy agent Carol Rayder (Katherine DeMille). The trail soon goes cold when Carol and her employer, Joseph Dure (Ivan Lebedeff), are found murdered.

While investigating Carol's murder, Roston learns that Fornay may be involved in the aircraft's mysterious failure. Deducing that Fielding must also be implicated in the sabotage of the test flight, Roston lures Fielding into taking a test flight with him. In the air, he threatens to crash the aircraft, forcing a confession from the inventor.

Cast
 Jack Holt as Major Roston 
 Ralph Morgan as Colonel Whalen 
 Paul Everton as General Mooyp 
 Katherine DeMille as Carol Rayder 
 C. Henry Gordon as William Fornay 
 Sidney Blackmer as Mann 
 Ivan Lebedeff as Joseph Dure 
 Regis Toomey as Lt. Gray 
 Holmes Herbert as Walter Fielding 
 Guy D'Ennery as Henry

Production
The working titles of Army Spy and Sabotage reflected a heightened atmosphere of international intrigue in the immediate period before World War II. Principal photography on Trapped in the Sky, took place from December 16 to December 30, 1938.

Reception
Aviation film historian Michael Paris in From the Wright Brothers to Top Gun: Aviation, Nationalism, and Popular Cinema (1995) considered Trapped in the Sky, a re-working of The Great Air Robbery (1919) a silent two-reel feature.

Aviation film historian James H. Farmer in Celluloid Wings: The Impact of Movies on Aviation (1984) dismissed Trapped in the Sky as a "low-budget action mystery" film.

References

Notes

Citations

Bibliography

 Farmer, James H. Celluloid Wings: The Impact of Movies on Aviation. Blue Ridge Summit, Pennsylvania: Tab Books Inc., 1984. .
 Hischak, Thomas S. 1939: Hollywood's Greatest Year. Lanham, Maryland: Rowman & Littlefield, 2017. . 
 Paris, Michael. From the Wright Brothers to Top Gun: Aviation, Nationalism, and Popular Cinema. Manchester, UK: Manchester University Press, 1995. .
 Pendo, Stephen. Aviation in the Cinema. Lanham, Maryland: Scarecrow Press, 1985. .

External links
 
 
 

1939 films
1930s thriller films
1930s English-language films
American aviation films
American thriller films
Films directed by Lewis D. Collins
Columbia Pictures films
1930s American films